Cary House may refer to:

Cary House (Pangburn, Arkansas), listed on the National Register of Historic Places (NRHP) in White County
Joshua B. Cary House, Centerville, Louisiana, listed on the National Register of Historic Places in St. Mary Parish
Otis Cary House, Foxboro, Massachusetts, listed on the NRHP in Norfolk County
Stephen Cary House, Mendham, New Jersey, listed on the NRHP in Morris County
G. W. Cary House, Millersburg, Ohio, listed on the NRHP in Holmes County 
Hiram W. Cary House, Millersburg, Ohio, listed on the NRHP in Holmes County
Leo J. Cary House, Coquille, Oregon, listed on the NRHP in Coos County
Lott Cary Birth Site, Charles City, Virginia, listed on the NRHP in Charles City County
Mary Ann Shadd Cary House, Washington, D.C., a National Historic Landmark and listed on the NRHP